Barbora Záhlavová-Strýcová and Klára Zakopalová were the defending champions but Zakopalová decided not to participate.
Záhlavová-Strýcová played alongside Dominika Cibulková but were eliminated in the Quarterfinals.
Sara Errani and Roberta Vinci won the title by beating Maria Kirilenko and Nadia Petrova 6–4, 3–6, [11–9] in the final.

Seeds

Draw

Draw

References
 Main Draw

UNICEF Open - Doubles
2012 Doubles